Pagadai Panirendu is a 1982 Indian Tamil-language martial arts film directed by Dhamodharan N., starring Kamal Haasan, Sripriya and Y. G. Mahendran. Kanchana plays a guest role. The film was released on 14 November 1982.

Plot 

The film is the story of Anand, a journalist and a martial arts expert. Anand is in love with Sripriya. He gets a microfilm showing the wrongdoings of underworld king Sudarsan. Now the gang is after Anand for the microfilm. Sudarsan's gang member Sathyapriya befriends Anand to get the microfilm, but fails. Meanwhile, Anand's love Sripriya leaves her house as her father, and Major Sundarrajan is against their affair. Sripriya gets threatened by Sudarsan's gang for the microfilm. Anand's friend Y. G. Mahendran also gets trapped by the underworld gang to retrieve the microfilm. Anand had to fight against his martial arts master too, who is an aide of Sudarsan. Finally, Anand succeeds in eliminating the entire gang, saving the microfilm. When viewing the film one is given the impression that it had significant delays in production. Having been started as early as 1978 after the success of two back-to back Kamal Haasan/Sri Priya starrers namely Ilamai Oonjaladugiradhu & Sattam En Kayil the film saw the light of the day finally in 1982.

Cast 

 Kamal Haasan – Anand
 Sripriya – Anand's lover Usha
 Kanchana – Anand's mother
 R. N. Sudarshan – Dais
 Major Sundarrajan – Usha's father
 Y. G. Mahendran – Vishnu
 Sathyapriya – Renuka
 Sathyaraj – henchman
 T. K. S. Natarajan

Soundtrack 
The music was composed by K. Chakravarthy and lyrics were written by Kannadasan and Vaali.

References

External links 
 

1980s Tamil-language films
1982 films
1982 martial arts films
Films scored by K. Chakravarthy
Indian martial arts films